The Orlov (German: Der Orlow) is a 1927 German silent film directed by Jacob Fleck and Luise Fleck and starring Vivian Gibson, Hans Junkermann and Georg Alexander. It was shot at the Babelsberg and Staaken Studios in Berlin. The film's sets were designed by the art director Jacek Rotmil.

Cast
Vivian Gibson as Nadja Nadjakowska - née Lady Proschaja  
Hans Junkermann as John Walsh  
Georg Alexander as Jolly Jefferson  
Bruno Kastner as Alexander Alexandrowitsch  
Max Ralph-Ostermann as Watson - police commissioner  
Evi Eva as Dolly Marbanks - Jolly's secretary  
Iván Petrovich as Alexander - Russian exile  
Ernst Behmer as Iwan Stephanow - Russian exile 
Weinau-Schallay as Leuchtturmwächter Flugzeugfabrik

References

External links

1927 films
Films of the Weimar Republic
German silent feature films
Films directed by Jacob Fleck
Films directed by Luise Fleck
Films based on operettas
German black-and-white films
Films shot at Babelsberg Studios
Films shot at Staaken Studios